William J. Biggy (January 23, 1859 - November 30, 1908) (died in the San Francisco Bay, near Alcatraz) was San Francisco Chief of Police 1907–08.

He was appointed Chief of Police by Mayor Edward Robeson Taylor. Upon elevation to the position of Chief, Biggy declared, as do most new chiefs in San Francisco, that he would "clean up" the department. Declaring a "shake-up" the department has not experienced in many years on his first day in office. One of his first acts was to demote his predecessor, Chief Jeremiah F. Dinan to the rank of patrolman. (New York Times, September 21, 1907 pg. 1)

The San Francisco Examiner published on June 15, 1908 the following news: To curtail speeders, San Francisco Police Chief William Biggy orders his mounted officers to lasso drivers who break the speed law and ignore the demand to "halt."

During the San Francisco graft prosecutions, Biggy was appointed Elisor by the court to hold Abraham Ruef in custody, which lasted more than a year, first in the temporary "little" Saint Francis Hotel and later in a house at 2849 Fillmore Street, after the sheriff and the coroner were disqualified.

After the non-fatal shooting of special prosecutor Francis J. Heney by an excused juror named Morris Haas, embarrassed by Heney as an ex-con during jury selection in the bribery trial of Abe Ruef, Chief of Police Biggy endured public criticism for negligence for the fact that Haas had a small derringer and committed suicide under police watch. Upon falling out with the men supporting the graft prosecution, Biggy was placed under surveillance by detectives employed by William J. Burns, a special agent to the prosecution.

Biggy went overboard from a police launch during a nighttime crossing of San Francisco Bay from Belvedere to San Francisco after discussing his resignation with police commissioner Hugo Keil. His body was found floating in the bay two weeks later. Because Biggy, a devout Catholic, was considered an unlikely suicide, the Coroner's Jury returned a verdict of accidental death although many people believed that he had committed suicide and the death remains unsolved.

California Senate
Biggy served in the California State Senate for the 21st district from 1893 to 1897.

References

External links
 His death and Photo
SFPD: Chiefs of the SFPD at www.sfgov.org List of SF Chiefs of Police
Join California William J. Biggy

Sources
Walton Bean: Boss Ruef's San Francisco - UC Press 1952 CA

1908 deaths
San Francisco Police Department chiefs
Democratic Party California state senators
19th-century American politicians
1859 births
San Francisco Board of Supervisors members